The Maddening is a 1995 psychological thriller film directed by Danny Huston.

Based on a novel by Andrew Neiderman, published under the title Playmates, this was a direct-to-video creepfest featuring Burt Reynolds and Angie Dickinson.

Synopsis

A young couple, Cassie and David Osborne, have an intense argument as he spends too much time on business trips. The next morning, after David goes to work, Cassie takes their five-year-old daughter Samantha to stay with her sister, Joanne, for a few days.

Having car trouble, they stop at a seedy-looking gas station, where they are tended to by Roy Scudder, the owner. Instead of helping the mother and child, Scudder rigs the vehicle to break down a short distance down the road. Then he drives down the road and offers to tow them back to his place.

Once there, Cassie meets Roy's insane wife Georgina, who's been out of sorts since the mysterious death of her baby boy. Samantha is made to be a "playmate" for the Scudders' daughter Jill, who appears to be as unstable as her mother. Georgina and Jill believe the two Osbornes to in fact be Marlena and Donna, respectively Georgina's widowed sister and niece.  Cassie hears Samantha cry and rushes upstairs, only to be led to the wrong room by Georgina who locks her in.

Joanne panics after Cassie and Samantha never reach her house. She calls the police, convinced that David had something to do with their disappearance. David begins desperately searching for his missing wife and child. He is tracked by a police officer who is convinced David has murdered Cassie and Samantha.  His suspicions are increased by a nosy neighbor who wrongfully insists that David beats Cassie.

Because of the room's lack of any toilet or bidet, Cassie is forced to put on her ankles pees quietly and quickly on the floor, revealing her lack of undies. Roy inadvertently leaves a large wrench in Cassie's room, which she hides and later uses to knock the pins up from the room's door hinges. A photo of Marlena shows a resemblance to Cassie and Roy remarks on the similarity before tearing up the photo. Georgina insists upon bathing Cassie and calling her "Sis." Cassie buys some time by saying she has to use the toilet and hides the wrench in the toilet bowl.  Georgina bathes Cassie who has grabbed a pair of scissors at a moment she thought Georgina had looked away.  Unfortunately, Georgina grabs the scissors from Cassie and cuts her hair to look more like Marlena.  Samantha is let out by Jill who is leading Samantha by a rope she's placed around her neck.  Samantha runs to her mother in the bathroom but she is pulled away from Cassie by Roy. Cassie attacks him with the wrench but is overpowered. He takes her back to her room and while he straddles her unconscious body he is encouraged to rape her by a hallucination of Roy's deceased father. The hallucination insists he will never get another chance as good as this and that he has not had sex for a long time, Georgina refusing to touch him since the death of their "idiot child" Arthur.

David sets out to find his wife and daughter, going first to Joanne's house.  Joanne receives a call from the detective notifying her that they'd found blood in the kitchen of the Osborne home.  He asks her to stall David so he remains there until they can come and arrest him.  Joanne accuses David of killing Cassie and Samantha, noting the blood found in the kitchen.  David shows her the blood came from his own hand when he cut it on a plate earlier.  David forces his way out, taking the keys to Joanne's and her husband's Volkswagen Microbus to avoid having the police track him in his car.  David stops for gas at the same station Cassie had used earlier and the mechanic asks him, as he did Cassie, if he is related to Ozzy Osbourne.  David learns from them that Cassie and Samantha had received directions on a shortcut towards Turkey Creek, where the Scudder home is.  David arrives at the Scudder's house and finds Roy in his garage.  Roy claims he has not seen Cassie and Samantha and would have noticed them driving a classic Ford Thunderbird.  David acts as if he is leaving but takes a look around the property.  Jill drops out the window the doll David bought for Samantha on his last business trip.  David realizes that his wife and daughter are in the house but before he can do anything, he is attacked by Roy and strangled with a chain.  He is dropped into a dry water well and partly buried. Roy returns to Cassie later that evening with drugged milk and he has a flashback of smothering Arthur in his crib to end Arthur's pain. He tells Cassie to change clothes in front of him. She starts doing this but then tells him that she will tell Georgina what he is doing and he leaves.

Later, David regains consciousness and climbs out of the well, in which he noticed human remains.  Meanwhile, a drugged Cassie escapes her room but in her unsteady state, tumbles down the last few steps and is knocked unconscious.  She is found by Roy who carries her back to bed, rapes her and then chains her to the bed. Samantha escapes from her room after Jill falls asleep and talks to her mother Cassie.  Cassie encourages Samantha to run out of the house and head for the woods, stopping the first car she sees.  Samantha isn't sure she can do this but heads out to try.  Shortly down the hall, she is grabbed by David and taken into the bathroom.  David hears Roy and Jill coming so he tells Samantha to go back to them, promising he will return for her.  He steps into the shower and then climbs out of the window before Roy enters.  Earlier in the film, Samantha told her father the story of the rabbit and the fox and he comments that sometimes, you can get people to do what you want them to by making them think the opposite is true.  Samantha tricks Jill into taking her into the woods by crying "Please don't take me to the woods" when Jill plans a punishment for Samantha escaping.  In the woods, Jill digs up Arthur's grave in which his mummified body remains and Samantha escapes.  David finds Cassie but needs to find something to remove the chains tying Cassie to the bed.  He hears Roy and runs out of the house.  He is hunted through the swamps by Roy who carries a shotgun.  David successfully hides underwater in the swamps and makes a run back to the house when Roy finds Arthur's opened grave and collapses in grief.

The police officer stops at the shady gas station where Cassie and later David had stopped that day.  David had paid with his credit card, leading the officer to the location.  The officer had previously admired a photo of David's classic Ford Thunderbird and seeing the medallion from the car in a bin at the counter of the gas station, he asks where all these auto parts came from.  The mechanics mention how Roy is always bringing them in.  The officer gets instructions to the Scudder home and finds the Volkswagen Microbus David took from his sister-in-law earlier.  He calls in his discovery but then has his throat cut by Roy and dies.

Cassie tells Georgina that Roy raped her but Georgina does not believe her.  Still in her delusion that Cassie is her sister Marlena, she mentions that Marlena was going to call the police to report that Roy had killed Arthur.  Georgina states that Marlena was always a "witch" and "witches must be burned," sitting in Roy's father's chair. David shuts off the power to the house from outside, and Georgina gets a hurricane lamp to light the room where she is sitting with Cassie.  David arrives with a hacksaw and begins to work on the chains tying Cassie to the bed.  Georgina accepts that he is Marlena's new husband and that it would be best for them to leave.  Roy arrives and tells Georgina that Marlena and Donna are dead and that they died when Georgina gave them lethal overdoses of sleeping tablets in milk to prevent them going to the police.
Roy gets into a fight with Cassie and David and throws the hurricane lamp at the wall starting a fire.

Being taunted by the hallucination of his father Roy shoots at the hallucination but instead kills Georgina. In the following combat Roy shouts to Cassie "I love you Marlena" before Cassie shoots him dead. The next day the Osborne parents are reunited with Samantha and Jill sits rocking on the well before dropping Samantha's doll into it.

Cast
 Burt Reynolds as Roy Scudder
 Angie Dickinson as Georgina Scudder
 Mia Sara as Cassie Osborne
 Candace Hutson as Jill Scudder
 Brian Wimmer as David Osborne
 Marie Debrey as Joanne
 Kayla Buglewicz as Samantha Osborne

External links
 
 
 

1995 films
1995 independent films
1990s mystery thriller films
1990s psychological thriller films
1995 direct-to-video films
American independent films
American mystery thriller films
American psychological thriller films
1990s English-language films
Films about rape
Films about sexuality
Films directed by Danny Huston
Films based on American novels
Trimark Pictures films
1990s American films